Matheus Enholm (born 1979) is a Swedish politician and member of the Riksdag since 2018 for the Sweden Democrats party.

Enholm represents the constituency of Västra Götaland County and takes seat 230 in parliament. He is a commissioner on the Constitution Committee in the Riksdag. Enholm also serves as the SD's spokesman on freedom of speech and was appointed to lead a commission against online censorship.

References 

1979 births
Living people
Members of the Riksdag 2018–2022
Members of the Riksdag from the Sweden Democrats
Members of the Riksdag 2022–2026
21st-century Swedish politicians
People from Munkedal Municipality